Gundam episodes may refer to episodes of various Gundam series:

Television episode guides and lists
List of Mobile Suit Gundam episodes
 List of Mobile Suit Zeta Gundam episodes
 List of Mobile Suit Gundam ZZ episodes
 List of Mobile Suit Victory Gundam episodes
 List of Mobile Fighter G Gundam episodes
List of Mobile Suit Gundam Wing episodes
 List of After War Gundam X episodes
 List of Turn A Gundam episodes
List of Mobile Suit Gundam SEED episodes 
 List of Mobile Suit Gundam 00 episodes
 List of Mobile Suit Gundam Unicorn episodes
 List of Mobile Suit Gundam AGE episodes
 List of Gundam Build Fighters episodes
 List of Gundam Reconguista in G episodes
 List of Gundam Build Fighters Try episodes
 List of Mobile Suit Gundam: Iron-Blooded Orphans episodes
 List of Gundam Build Divers episodes

Other episodes
Mobile Suit Gundam Wing: Episode Zero, the manga prequel to Mobile Suit Gundam Wing